Guo Meiqi (born 9 January 2000) is a Chinese tennis player.

She has career-high WTA rankings of 459 in singles and 362 in doubles, both achieved in March 2020.

Guo made her WTA Tour main-draw debut at the 2017 Guangzhou International Open in the doubles draw, partnering Sun Xuliu.

ITF Circuit finals

Singles: 3 (1 title, 2 runner–ups)

Doubles: 4 (3 titles, 1 runner–up)

External links
 
 

2000 births
Living people
Chinese female tennis players
Sportspeople from Guangzhou
Tennis players from Guangdong
21st-century Chinese women